Marcel Liebman (7 July 1929 – 1 March 1986) was a Belgian Marxist historian of political sociology and theory, active at the Université libre de Bruxelles and Vrije Universiteit Brussel.

Life 
A historian of socialism and of communism, he published a number of well known essays, notably on the Russian Revolution, Leninism, and the history of the labour movement in Belgium. He was also an early initiator of Israeli–Palestinian dialogue.

On 9 July 1943, Marcel's older brother, Henri, was arrested by the Gestapo and sent to Malines. Several weeks later on 31 July, he was transported to Auschwitz with 1,555 other deportees where he was in all probability sent to the gas chambers upon arrival as he had not yet turned 16 years of age. Henri was born 15 October 1927 in Brussels and died in August 1943. Of the 1,556 deportees sent to Auschwitz on 31 July, only 40 returned after the camps were liberated.

From 1962 to 1967, he was editor of the weekly journal La Gauche (The Left) and in 1968 founded the journal Mai (May) which existed until 1973.

His son Riton Liebman is a comedian, author and director. Riton's actual name is Henri, named after Marcel's lost brother.

A foundation under the directorship  was created at the Université libre de Bruxelles upon Liebman's death in 1986. In December 2005, the foundation was converted into the Marcel Liebman Institute. It aims to contribute to socialist thought and the study of the left as well as a critical reflection on the practices of social movements.

English bibliography

Books 
 "Introduction" in Isaac Deutscher, Russia After Stalin (Jonathan Cape, London, 1969).
 The Russian Revolution (Vintage Books, 1972).
 Leninism Under Lenin (Merlin Press, 1973).
 Born Jewish: A Childhood in Occupied Europe (Verso Books, 2005)

Essays

Articles 
 "Trotsky assassiné," La Gauche (August 1965).
 "Lenin in 1905. A revolution that shook a doctrine," Monthly Review (1970).

External links 
 Marcel Liebman Archive at marxists.org
 Institut Marcel Liebman
 Articles in English

1929 births
1986 deaths
20th-century Belgian historians
Belgian Jews
Belgian Marxist historians
Jewish historians
Jewish socialists
Marxist theorists
Deutscher Memorial Prize winners